This is an inclusive list of science fiction television programs whose names begin with the letter A.

A
Live-action
A for Andromeda (franchise):
A for Andromeda (1961, UK)
Andromeda Breakthrough, The (1962, UK, A for Andromeda sequel)
A for Andromeda (2006, UK, A for Andromeda remake)
Aaron Stone (2009–2010, US/Canada)
Adam Adamant Lives! (1966–1967, UK)
Adventures of Brisco County, Jr., The (1993–1994)
Adventures of Don Quick, The (1970, UK)
Adventures of the Elektronic, The a.k.a. Priklyucheniya Elektronika (1980, Soviet Union, miniseries)
After, The (2014, pilot)
Agent Carter (2015-2016)
Agents of S.H.I.E.L.D. (2013–2020)
Airwolf (1984–1987)
ALF (franchise):
Project ALF (1996, ALF sequel, film)
ALF (1986–1990)
Alias (2001-2006)
Alice (2009, miniseries)
Alien Hunter (2003, film)
Alien Nation (franchise):
Alien Nation (1989–1990)
Alien Nation: Dark Horizon (1990, first film)
Alien Nation: Body and Soul (1995, second film)
Alien Nation: Millennium (1996, third film)
Alien Nation: The Enemy Within (1996, fourth film)
Alien Nation: The Udara Legacy (1997, fifth film)
Alienated (2003–2004, Canada)
Aliens in the Family (1987, UK) IMDb
Aliens in the Family (1996)
Almost Human (2013–2014)
Alpha Scorpio (1974, Australia)
Alphas (2011–2012)
Altered Carbon (2018)
Amanda and the Alien (1995, UK, film)
Amazing Stories (1985–1987, anthology)
Amazon (1999, Canada/Germany)
Ambassador Magma (1966–1967, 1993, Japan) a.k.a. Space Giants, The (US)
American Gothic (1995–1996)
Andra (1976, Australia) IMDb
Andro-Jäger, Der (1982–1984, Germany)
Android Kikaider a.k.a. Jinzô ningen Kikaidâ (1972–1973, Japan)
Andromeda (2000–2005)
Angel (1999–2004) (elements of science fiction)
Animorphs (1998–1999)
Another Life (2019–2021)
Aphrodite Inheritance, The (1979)
Aquila (1997–1998, UK)
Ark II (1976)
Ascension (2014)
Astronauts (1981, UK)
Atom Squad (1953–1954)
Atomic Rulers of the World (1964, film)
Automan (1983–1984)
Avengers, The (franchise, UK):
New Avengers, The (1976–1977, UK, Avengers, The sequel)
Avengers, The (1961–1969, UK)
Aventuras En El Tiempo a.k.a. Adventures in Time (2001, Mexico)
Avenue 5 (2020–present)
Awake (2012)
Away (2020)

Animated
Acrobunch (1982, Japan, animated)
Action Man (franchise):
Action Man (1995, UK, animated)
Action Man (2000, UK, animated)
A.T.O.M. (Alpha Teens On Machines) (2005–2006, Action Man spin-off, France, animated)
Adventures of the Galaxy Rangers, The (1986–1989, animated)
Adventures of Jimmy Neutron: Boy Genius, The a.k.a. Jimmy Neutron (franchise):
Adventures of Jimmy Neutron: Boy Genius, The (2002–2006, animated)
The Egg-pire Strikes Back (2003, special, animated)
Operation: Jet Fusion (2003, film, animated)
Jimmy Timmy Power Hour, The (2004, film, animated)
Attack of the Twonkies (2004, film, animated)
League of Villains, The (2005, film, animated)
Jimmy Timmy Power Hour 2: When Nerds Collide, The (2006, film, animated)
Jimmy Timmy Power Hour 3: The Jerkinators, The (2007, film, animated)
Planet Sheen (2010–2012, Adventures of Jimmy Neutron: Boy Genius, The spin-off, animated)
Æon Flux (1991–1995, animated)
Aldnoah.Zero (2014–2015, Japan, animated)
ALF: The Animated Series (1987–1989, ALF spin-off, animated)
Alien News Desk (2019, animated)
Alien Racers (2005, animated)
Alienators: Evolution Continues (2001–2002, US, animated) a.k.a. Evolution: the Animated Series (UK)
Amazing 3, The (1965–1966, Japan, animated)
Amazing Screw-On Head, The (2006, pilot, animated)
Android Announcer Maico 2010 (1998, Japan, animated)
Angel Links (1999, Japan, animated)
Ani*Kuri15 (2007–2008, Japan, animated short) (elements of science fiction in some episodes)
Aquaman (1968–1970, animated)
Aquatic Language (2002, Japan, short film, animated)
Archie's Weird Mysteries (1999–2000, animated)
Argai: The Prophecy a.k.a. Argaï: La prophétie (2000, France, animated)
Argevollen (2014, Japan, animated)
Aria (2005–2008, Japan, animated)
Armored Police Metal Jack (1981, Japan, animated)
Armored Trooper Votoms (1983–1984, Japan, animated)
Arpeggio of Blue Steel (2013, Japan, animated)
Astro Boy (franchise):
Astro Boy (1963–1966, Japan, animated)
Astro Boy (1980–1981, Japan, animated)
Astro Boy (2003–2004, Japan, animated)
Astroganger (1972–1973, Japan, animated)
Atomic Betty (2004–2008, Canada/France, animated)
Attack of the Killer Tomatoes: The Animated Series (1990–1992, animated)
Aura Battler Dunbine (1983–1984, Japan, animated)
Avenger (2003, Japan, animated)
Avengers, The (franchise):
Marvel's Avengers Assemble (2013–2019, animated)
Avengers: Earth's Mightiest Heroes, The (2010–2012, animated)
Avengers: United They Stand, The (1999–2000, animated)

References

Television programs, A